The Village is a city in Oklahoma County, Oklahoma, United States, and a part of the  Oklahoma City metropolitan area. The population was 9500 at the 2020 Census.

The Village is an enclave city nearly surrounded in full by Oklahoma City, except where it abuts Nichols Hills. The Village is home to the corporate headquarters of Love's Travel Stops & Country Stores, the OKC Friday community newspaper, and Casady School.

The Village has a City Manager form of government. The City Manager is overseen by an elected Council. The position of Mayor rotates among the Council members.

The Village is represented in Congress by Stephanie Bice, in the Oklahoma Senate by Julia Kirt, and in the Oklahoma House by and Cyndi Munson.

Geography
The Village is located at  (35.568723, -97.556600).

Oklahoma City surrounds the borders of The Village.

Demographics

At the 2000 census there were 10,157 people in 4,778 households, including 2,823 families, in the city. The population density was 3,999.8 people per square mile (1,544.0/km). There were 4,997 housing units at an average density of 1,967.8 per square mile (759.6/km). The racial makeup of the city was 80.19% White, 10.47% African American, 2.54% Native American, 1.91% Asian, 0.03% Pacific Islander, 1.13% from other races, and 3.73% from two or more races. Hispanic or Latino of any race were 3.77%.

Of the 4,778 households 24.2% had children under the age of 18 living with them, 42.8% were married couples living together, 10.9% had a female householder with no husband present, and 43.0% were non-families. 35.2% of households were one person and 12.1% were one person aged 65 or older. The average household size was 2.12 and the average family size was 2.76.

The age distribution was 20.2% under the age of 18, 10.2% from 18 to 24, 34.4% from 25 to 44, 18.9% from 45 to 64, and 16.3% 65 or older. The median age was 35 years. For every 100 females, there were 86.8 males. For every 100 females age 18 and over, there were 84.1 males.

The median household income was $37,559 and the median family income  was $44,632. Males had a median income of $32,204 versus $24,896 for females. The per capita income for the city was $20,444. About 7.2% of families and 10.1% of the population were below the poverty line, including 13.3% of those under age 18 and 7.9% of those age 65 or over.

Shopping
Local Shopping:
 Village Park South
 Village Park North
 North Park Mall
 French Market Mall
 Casady Square Shopping Center

References

External links
 The Village
 Chabad Jewish Community Center

Oklahoma City metropolitan area
Cities in Oklahoma County, Oklahoma
Cities in Oklahoma